Tordis Ørjasæter (born 25 March 1927) is a Norwegian literary critic, biographer, former professor of educational science, and novelist. She has been particularly engaged in culture and literature for children. She has written biographical works on Sigrid Undset, Selma Lagerlöf, Tove Jansson, and Nini Roll Anker. She was awarded the Brage Prize in 1993.

References

1927 births
Possibly living people
Writers from Oslo
Norwegian literary critics
Women literary critics
Norwegian women non-fiction writers
Norwegian biographers
Norwegian educationalists